The Circus Games Mosaic is a 2nd-century Roman mosaic depicting a chariot race in quadrigas. It was discovered in 1806 in the Ainay district of Lyon (ancient Lugdunum) and is now on display in the Gallo-Roman Museum of Lyon.

Discovery
This mosaic is also known as mosaic "Macors" named Paul Macors, owner closed which were discovered mosaics in the Ainay area between 1806 and 1809. According to the chroniclers of the time, it could have been discovered at three different but nearby places: either at the southeast corner of Rue Victor Hugo and Jarente, 24 rue Jarente  or even 39 rue Victor Hugo. 
On Lot VI, the so-called "circus" mosaic was unearthed on February 18, 1806 by workers digging a reservoir. Buried under a meter of topsoil, it has no index ruin. Reddish gravel that covered the mosaic suggests it had been covered to protect it. Only the Greek surrounds the mosaic and intended to visually increase the size is very degraded. Macors Paul, conscious of his wealth, built a small Doric temple above the mosaic in order to protect it.

From 5 to 20 June 1806, the people of Lyon and other curious could visit the mosaic for a small fee that was to pay the effort of the workers. June 26, 1806, teachers and students were invited to observe the mosaic and the garden, probably during the construction of the temple. We do not know when the visit is possible again, but Mr. Macors states that from 1 November 1808 to 1 May 1809, the mosaic will be more visible and will be made new digs. He discovers a new mosaic called "Meleager" it does protect the construction of a second flag. Arts lovers, Mr. Macors decided to create the Circle Garden Mosaics so visitors are curious and cultivate their knowledge and offer a moment of rest and entertainment in a place where the attractions are no different from neighboring breweries.  This Circle lasted only a year 1 July 1809 to 30 June 1810, and the death of Paul Macors 12 March 1811 precipitated the sale of the Garden Mosaics. City Council deliberated on 29 May 1811 on the subject and decided to create a commission to determine the procedures for the acquisition of land by the city. The Council decided to postpone its decision at the meeting of April 20, 1812. The report "Chaussagne the" fixed the purchase price of the mosaic to 5000 francs and then plans to buy the adjoining land. Council adjourned its decision.

Mr. Macors field is then divided into two: north and south house the temple which covers the mosaic. The auction takes place on September 18, 1812  and the fields are awarded to Vincent Depierre and his son Charles, residing in rue Sainte-Catherine. The new owners made a new offer to the City Council and it is then that the prefect, Monsieur le Comte de Bondy suggested to the mayor to include a sum of 6,000 francs on the 1813 budget for the acquisition of the mosaic so that the city retains it. This was too late because the mosaic has been sold on August 10, 1813 to two architects, Jacques and Victor Ruffaut Rivoiron for 4,900 francs. The architects destroyed the temple and decided to transfer the mosaic to Paris. This is not counting on the will of the mayor of Lyon, Albon, who under the law of 18 Brumaire Year III on the protection of monuments, makes an order prohibiting the removal of the two mosaics. The City agrees to pay them 4,900 francs incurred to which it added 2,100 francs as reimbursement of expenses and allowances. She agrees to move the mosaic within three months. A shed is then built to protect the pavement. Total transactions ultimately cost 7,535 francs and moving mosaic wait ... 1818 !

Acquired in 1813, the mosaic must still undergo several degradation: Depierre filled the ditches to protect the pavement from moisture and decide to close the field. These actions were reported to the mayor by Artaud 16 April 1814 and the next day the mayor wrote to Depierre requiring removal of the pavement. In 1815, Depierre reoffended and molested the guardian appointed by the mayor to monitor the field. They complained about not being able to pierce the streets in their field they plan to sell building lots. On 26 July 1817, within a fortnight Depierre threatened to continue the work they have already committed, the consequence would be the destruction of the ancient pavement.  The prefect then made an order which prohibited Depierre to continue the work and forced them to surrender the land to the city agrees to move the mosaic.

It is still unknown what delayed the movement of the mosaic, a possible cause was the technical difficulties of the transfer. Artaud gives no explanation other than bad political circumstances. One known technique at that time, that moves Schneyder of a mosaic, if the cement is healthy, which seemed not to be the case since it has been altered by moisture. It was not until the process Belloni for the Lyons mosaic, starting with that of "Circus Games" could be moved. It will then be the turn of the mosaic "Cassaire" and the so-called "Michoud". Belloni, Director of the royal manufactory of mosaics Paris invented a method to move the tiles. The Comte de Fargues, Mayor of Lyon, teaches a method exists and tells the City Council that Mr. Belloni agrees to come to Lyon to transport the mosaic Palais Saint-Pierre for the sum of 6,000 francs. Parisian mosaic arrived in Lyon in early October 1818 and the work of displacement took place from October 8 to November 3. It takes eight months of work to restore the pavement in the workshop Belloni invites competent to check the parts of the mosaic before the removal person. This is done by the company and Company Widow Souplet. The museum will host Saint Peter mosaic on the floor of the Hall of Antiques while the inventory of 1833 falls in the Cabinet des Antiques, room at the southeast corner of the museum. The mosaic will eventually filed in December 1819 and January 1820. In 1835, Artaud says that the total cost of restoration and displacement reaches about 23,000 francs, far from the 6,000 francs that the Council had agreed in 1817.

In 1863, the movement of the mosaic is decided during the expansion of the museum on the current street Édouard-Herriot. The new location is chosen room antique casts, the first floor of the east wing. On 20 March 1870, the prefect decided to entrust a new restoration of the mosaic (as well as so-called "Children's Games") to Mora mosaic father and son. Mosaic circus games then joined the mosaic Cucherat or "Fish", present in the room antique casts since 1845. In 1921, during the drafting of the Revue du Lyonnais, the mosaic is still based in the same room at the Gallo-Roman Museum in Fourvière.

In 1975, the mosaic moved into the current museum.

Source problems
Artaud publishes three almost identical descriptions mosaic in two monographs in 1806 and in the book of 1835. Board drawn and engraved monograph illustrates the folio of 1806 and is followed by three detail images in the book of 1835. Several reproductions of mosaics, more or less happy, appear in subsequent publications, such as the History of the Romans Victor Duruy  or in Gallia Camille Jullian  .  It must be admitted that only the board of Artaud represents the mosaic as it was found, without renovation.  While admitting some interpretations, the first board presents the mosaic as it was in 1806, not one has Belloni in 1818 .

Description
Artaud gives the dimensions of the pavement in situ 5.035 × 3.086 m. After the second sitting in the hall of the Mummy Comarmond measuring 4.97 × 3 m, very close to modern dimensions.

Mosaic is rectangular. Its scope is black, polychrome decoration. From the exterior to the interior, the mosaic provides a framework consisting of a frieze of white teeth and a black border of three stones wide and again a wide white border of two stones. Then comes a great foliage leaving a cup placed on the left and whose lobes are filled with flowers with four petals, larger on the right of the mosaic decoration which results in a rich vegetable decoration side. Then comes a large white net three stones and a large continuous braid, again a white net three stones.

The decor has the central arena of a circus without the stands. On the left side is the delivery of tanks (carceres) topped by a box (pulvinar) forming the oppidum. It is structure which tends to prove that the mosaic image of the circus of the ancient city of Lugdunum, which corroborates the link with the epigraphy, including mention of the college of centonaires who financed the reconstruction of the circus after its wooden benches were burned.

The door through which leave the tanks, carried pompae, is surrounded by two pillars, one of which disappeared in a crack in the pavement that also hides a character we know only the head surmounted by a red cap and bears blue breeches. Perhaps this inspector game On both sides of the porta pompae carceres are eight, four on each side. Can provide some dating mosaic speculating a prior to the reign of Domitian, which establishes the use of six tanks, so carceres twelve, six back-to-six tanks and discharge. The lodge is occupied by three judges whose central characters, the sponsor of the show, holding the mappa, machine let loose to signify the start of the race.

Spina, massive central masonry around which the chariots turn, sharing the arena in its greatest length. It has two pools rectangular shape with the left features an obelisk. In the passage between the two basins are two characters. Lyon mosaic is remarkable in several respects (including the presence of three judges in the box), but the most intriguing is represented by the absence of these altars and other small temples that adorn the other known spinae as they are replaced here by basins. Each of the two basins present a set of pillars and architrave bearing the one seven balls and the other seven dolphins spouting water. These oval balls (or eggs) and these dolphins are lowered at every turn (curriculum).

Staff is on the edge of the track: a Sparsör ("sprinkler") holds a full bowl of water, it is responsible for watering the track, horses, and chariot wheels in case of overheating. In the corner, an agitator holds a whip, likely to excite the horses, and strength, perhaps intended to cut the reins of the horses in case of accident. A lonely rider straddles side runners, perhaps is it a steward.

Bibliography
 F. Artaud, Histoire abrégée de la peinture en mosaïque, suivie de la description des mosaïques du Midi de la France,in 8, Description de la mosaïque de M. Macors, Grande monographie de 1806.
 Revue du Lyonnais, octobre-décembre 1921, pp. 453 – 504.
 Anne-Catherine Le Mer, Claire Chomer, Carte archéologique de la Gaule, Lyon 69/2, Paris, 2007, 883 pages.

References

Ancient chariot racing
Roman mosaics
2nd-century works
Roman Lyon
Archaeological discoveries in France